The Oaklawn Plantation is a historic plantation house in Natchitoches, Louisiana. It is located on the Louisiana Highway 494 east of Natchitoches in Natchitoches Parish, Louisiana. It has been listed on the National Register of Historic Places since March 28, 1979.

History
The mansion was built in 1830 for Narcisse Prudhomme, who held as many as 104 enslaved people on the property. After his death in 1859, the plantation was inherited by his son, Achille Prudhomme. Although the plantation survived the Civil War of 1861-1865 intact, after Achille's death, the land was divided into parcels by his heirs and sold off. In 1916, Charles Edgar Cloutier, the husband of Adeline Prudhomme, a great-grandniece of Narcisse Prudhomme, purchased the property.

It is now owned by filmwriter Robert Harling, author of the play, later a film, Steel Magnolias (dir. Herbert Ross, 1989).

Architecture
The house has three stories, fourteen chimneys and a large gallery. It is an example of French creole architecture.

References

Houses completed in 1830
Plantation houses in Louisiana
Houses in Natchitoches Parish, Louisiana
Cane River National Heritage Area
Houses on the National Register of Historic Places in Louisiana
Antebellum architecture
Creole architecture in Louisiana
1830 establishments in Louisiana
National Register of Historic Places in Natchitoches Parish, Louisiana